Azaflı (known as Azaplı until 2012) is a village and municipality in the Tovuz Rayon of Azerbaijan.  It has a population of 1,592.

Notes

References 

Populated places in Tovuz District